Basílio Emídio de Moraes Júnior (born 11 May 1982, in João Pessoa, Paraíba) is a Brazilian sprinter who competed in the 2004 Summer Olympics.

Achievements

References

 

1982 births
Living people
Brazilian male sprinters
Olympic athletes of Brazil
Athletes (track and field) at the 2004 Summer Olympics
Pan American Games gold medalists for Brazil
Pan American Games medalists in athletics (track and field)
Athletes (track and field) at the 2007 Pan American Games
Medalists at the 2007 Pan American Games
Sportspeople from Paraíba
20th-century Brazilian people
21st-century Brazilian people